Exaplatanos (Macedonian: Капињани, Kapinjani;) is a village and a former municipality in the Pella regional unit, Greece. Since the 2011 local government reform it is part of the municipality Almopia, of which it is a municipal unit. The municipal unit has an area of 422.907 km2. Population 7,243 (2011). In 1912 the village numbered 1,315 residents exclusively Pomak Muslims.

One of the villages in this municipal unit is Archangelos (Megleno-Romanian: Ossiani).

References

External links
Official website of Exaplatanos 

Populated places in Pella (regional unit)

bg:Къпиняни (дем)